The Tom Stoppard Prize is a literary award given annually for outstanding primarily non-fiction work by a writer of Czech origin. It was established in 1983 and first awarded in 1984, to Eva Kantůrková for My Companions in the Bleak House. The award is named for and funded by the Czech-born British playwright Tom Stoppard. In recent years, the award has been made at the Mayor's residence in Prague. The award was organised by the Charter 77 Foundation until 2017; since 2021 it has been awarded by the Václav Havel Library.

Recipients

Notes

References

See also 
 List of Czech literary awards
 Samizdat

Czech literary awards